Angel Cup (엔젤컵) is a manhwa about girls' soccer in the Republic of Korea. The writer is Jae-ho Youn (윤재호), and the artist is Dong-wook Kim (김동욱).

The series was translated into English by Tokyopop; the Tokyopop version of the manhwa is out of print as of August 31, 2009.

Plot
Angel Cup is a story about the formation of a High School Girls' Soccer League in the Republic of Korea. It centers around two female players in particular; So-jin Lee and Shin-bee. For So-jin, she has given up on soccer years ago, after losing to her former rival, Shin-bee. But, when she transfers to Han Shin High School, So-jin challenges the boys' varsity team to soccer matches, when Shin-bee has been appointed manager of the Han Shin High boys' varsity team. However for So-jin, there was no girls' soccer league in Han Shin High. Or what’s worse, So-jin was literally insulted from derogatory remarks by the boys' team. So, So-jin decided to form a girls' varsity team, in order to get back at them for what they said and did. Now, through hard work and strong determination, So-jin Lee and her team, The Han Shin High Blue Angels struggle throughout soccer matches, and their everyday lives.

References

External links
Tokyopop Information page
 

Action-adventure comics
Daewon C.I. titles
2001 comics debuts
Association football in anime and manga
Manhwa titles
Tokyopop titles